Vallermosa, Biddaramosa in sardinian language, is a comune (municipality) in the Province of South Sardinia in the Italian region Sardinia, located about  northwest of Cagliari.

Vallermosa borders the following municipalities: Decimoputzu, Iglesias, Siliqua, Villacidro, Villasor.

Demographic evolution

References

Cities and towns in Sardinia